Robin Merrill is a British musician, presenter, producer and journalist. He was a member of the original London cast of the musical Evita. He was a journalist, starting his journalism career with BFBS radio in 1989 and then for Deutsche Welle-TV.

Singing career
Born in Salisbury, Merrill displayed his musical talents at an early age. He won a scholarship at the age of 13 to the musical academia at Repton School. Merrill then joined up with London's Guildhall School of Music and Drama where he embarked upon a study of singing.

He then successfully auditioned to become a member of the original cast of the Tim Rice and Andrew Lloyd Webber musical Evita, which was showcased upon London's West End. Merrill went on to soon be a member of the Pasadena Roof Orchestra where as lead singer he performed swing music tunes from the 1930s and 1940s. Since 1979 he has also made numerous recordings as a singer with the Pasadena Roof Orchestra. In 1988 Merrill last appeared as lead singer with the Pasadena Roof Orchestra in the theater of the Savoy Hotel London.

From 1989 Merrill lived in Berlin and had numerous engagements as a solo singer and emcee in Europe . In 1993 Merrill appeared at the Ronacher Theater in Vienna as a solo singer and conférencier in Ronacher specialties . In 1993 he appeared in the Wintergarten in Berlin as a solo singer and emcee in the Kapriolen program , directed by André Heller .

In 1993 he founded the Savoy Dance Orchestra with Stefan Warmuth, the musical director of the Wintergarten in Berlin, trying to build on his past as a singer with the Pasadena Roof Orchestra . In 1994 Merrill was the solo singer at the Federal Press Ball .

From 1999 onwards there followed further appearances as a singer: 1999/2000 in the winter garden as conférencier and singer in the millennium show As Time Goes By , directed by Bernhard Paul . In 2000 he also played at the Theater am Kurfürstendamm in the operetta Im Weißen Rössl . With the show As Time Goes By he also appeared in the Friedrichsbau-Varieté in Stuttgart in 2000 and in 2001 in Roncalli's Apollo Varieté in Düsseldorf.

Further programs followed in 2001: Varieté, Varieté - for the open-air variety evening at the BUGA in Potsdam and Swingle Bells , with which Merrill again performed in the winter garden .

Journalist career 
Merrill started his journalistic career with BFBS radio in 1989. Merrill switched in 1994 to German TV channel DW where he has worked as a presenter and journalist ever since. From 1995 to 2002 Merrill worked for Deutsche Welle-TV as an English-speaking presenter on the weekly program Regarding - the Story of the Week , the English edition of Subject - Topic of the Week

Merrill has been working for Deutsche Welle-TV since 2002 as a producer, presenter and news anchor, including for " euromaxx - Life and Culture in Europe " (TV magazine, English-language edition), which he accompanied for 8 years.

From 2012 he presented the weekly show "Insight Germany".

Now retired, he only performs occasionally.

Filmography 

 1967: Far From the Madding Crowd (actor, feature film) Director: John Schlesinger
 1996: Hunt for CM 24 (actor, TV film) Director: Peter Ristau
 1996: Priest of Love (actor, feature film) Director: Christopher Miles
 1996: Sahara (actor, feature film) Director: Andrew V. McLaglen
 1997: wanted files (actor, TV series)
 1997: Our Charlie (actor, TV series)
 1997: Visioner (actor, TV-movie) Director: Elodie Keene
 1998: The Streets of Berlin (Actor, TV Series) Director: Ate de Jong
 1999: Swing ist das Ding (actor, documentary film) Director: Niels Bolbrinker

Personal life
Merrill is married to wife Karola and they have two children.

He is also a fan of English football club Arsenal.

References

External links
DW Arts & Culture
IMDB Profile

British male singers
Swing revival musicians
Living people
Year of birth missing (living people)